George William Webb (23 October 1857 – 26 December 1931) was an English professional cricketer, umpire and cricket coach. Webb played in two first-class cricket matches for Kent County Cricket Club.

Early life
Webb was born at Derringstone, part of Barham in Kent in 1857. His father, James, was a publican who ran The White Horse in nearby Bridge. His mother, Harriet, came from Newmarket in Suffolk.

Cricket career
After playing for Kent Colts in 1879, Webb made his first-class debut for the county side in 1880 against Sussex. He was employed as a professional cricketer and coach throughout the 1880s, working at locations such as Westminster School, Croome Court and Oxford University and by the early 1890s was working at Tonbridge School and playing for Tonbridge Cricket Club. After a good performance for a side of professionals against the Gentlemen of Kent in 1892 he made his second and final first-class appearance for the county side, taking a single wicket against Somerset at Taunton. After the establishment of the Tonbridge Nursery in 1897, Webb was employed as a coach at the Nursery until 1900.

Webb stood as an umpire between 1883 and 1913, umpiring Oxford University matches until 1905 when he umpired county cricket matches. He umpired 133 first-class matches in total, and stood in three Test matches during the 1912 Triangular Tournament. He also operated a sport outfitters shop in Tonbridge from the 1890s.

Family
Webb's brother, Arthur Webb, almost eleven years his junior, played for Hampshire County Cricket Club between 1895 and 1904, scoring over 5,000 runs in 49 first-class matches for the side. He later played as an amateur for Glamorgan in the Minor Counties Championship. Another brother Fred Webb was a well known jockey, winning the Epsom Derby on Doncaster in 1873 after the original jockey engaged was found to be drunk before the race. He won many other significant races and later had a distinguished career as a trainer.

Webb married Margaret Redfern in 1894; the couple had two daughters. He died in 1931 at Stoke-by-Nayland in Suffolk aged 74.

Notes

References

External links

1857 births
1931 deaths
English cricketers
Kent cricketers
People from the City of Canterbury